Heterometrus spinifer, the Asian forest scorpion, giant blue scorpion, or giant forest scorpion,  is a species of  scorpions belonging to the family Scorpionidae.

Description
The body is shiny black with gray-green reflections. The pincers are highly developed. In captivity it feeds primarily on insects, mainly cockroaches, crickets, and locusts. Its venom can cause severe pain, and mild numbness in the affected area, but it is not typically lethal to humans. These scorpions tend to be skittish and defensive, using their large pedipalps (pincers) to attack, more than their tails.

Distribution and habitat
This species can be found in Southeast Asia, including Malaysia, Thailand, Indonesia, Cambodia, Vietnam, Sri Lanka, India, and other Southeast Asian countries . Generally, these terrestrial scorpions live in moist forests in the dark undergrowth under logs or other debris, and they burrow into the ground where they hide during the day.

Captivity
The Asian Forest Scorpion is commonly kept in the pet trade due to its low venom toxicity  and large size.

References

External links
 NCBI
 Animal World

Scorpionidae
Scorpions of Asia
Fauna of Southeast Asia
Animals described in 1828